A canine butcher is a butcher shop specializing in the sale and processing of dog meat.

History 
Over the centuries, the consumption of dog meat has occurred, usually as a result of hardship, but sometimes as part of a culture. As a result, shops specializing in dog meat have opened.

Europe

France 
In France, during the Franco-Prussian War, butcheries of dogs opened, along with butcheries of many other strange animals, due to food shortages caused by the war and the Siege of Paris.

Netherlands 
Dog butchers existed in the Netherlands, as an advertisement for a "hondeslagerij" from 1928 attests.

Asia

China 
In Yulin, Guangxi, canine butcher shops slaughter around 300 dogs a day. During a dog meat festival in 2010, reactions were heavily divided between animal rights advocates and dog meat lovers. However, the practice of eating dogs is slowly dying out due to pressure from the growing middle class in China, who prefer keeping dogs as pets over eating them. As a result, the number of canine butchers is dwindling year by year.

South Korea 
The largest dog butchery in South Korea, located in Seongnam, closed in May 2017.

See also
Butcher shop
Dog meat

Notes and references 

Dog meat
Butcher shops